Arthur Henry Delmé-Radcliffe (23 November 1870 — 30 June 1950) was an English first-class cricketer and educator.

The son of The Reverend Henry Eliot Delmé-Radcliffe, he was born in November 1870 at South Tidworth, Hampshire. He was educated at Sherborne School, where he played for the school cricket team. From there, he matriculated to Exeter College, Oxford. He made his debut in first-class cricket for Hampshire against Leicestershire at Portsmouth in the 1896 County Championship. He played first-class cricket intermittently for Hampshire until 1900, making seven appearances. He scored 190 runs at an average of 14.61, with a highest score of 43.

Delmé-Radcliffe was involved in an unusual incident in a County Championship match against Somerset in a second-class county match for Hampshire in 1889. Believing himself to have been stumped from the final ball of the over, he proceeded to make his way back to the pavilion, but the appeal was not upheld by the umpire. A fielder then pulled a stump out of the ground to run him out, but the umpire had called the end of the over, allowing him to continue his innings. He played minor counties cricket for Berkshire in 1897, making seven appearances in the Minor Counties Championship. Outside of cricket, he was a private schoolmaster. Delmé-Radcliffe died in June 1950 at Branksome Park, Dorset.

References

External links

1870 births
1950 deaths
People from South Tidworth
People educated at Sherborne School
Alumni of Exeter College, Oxford
English cricketers
Hampshire cricketers
Berkshire cricketers
English schoolteachers